Cheshmeh Kabud (also Romanized as Cheshmeh Kabūd; also known as Sahbāzābād, Shahbāzābād, and Shahvarābād) is a village in Shaban Rural District, in the Central District of Nahavand County, Hamadan Province, Iran. At the 2006 census, its population was 25, in 7 families.

References 

Populated places in Nahavand County